Kalininsky is a rural locality (a khutor) in Yanybayevsky Selsoviet, Zianchurinsky District, Bashkortostan, Russia. The population was 17 as of 2010. There is 1 street.

Geography 
Kalininsky is located 103 km southeast of Isyangulovo (the district's administrative centre) by road. Nizhneye Mambetshino is the nearest rural locality.

References 

Rural localities in Zianchurinsky District